Bical may refer to:

 Bical (grape), a white Portuguese wine grape
 A shorthand and brand name for the antiandrogen bicalutamide